The Chevrolet Avalanche is a four-door, five or six-passenger pickup truck sharing GM's long-wheelbase chassis used on the Chevrolet Suburban and Cadillac Escalade EXT. Breaking with a long-standing tradition, the Avalanche was unavailable as a GMC, but only as a Chevrolet. Production of the Avalanche started in July 2001 and ended April 2013, producing two generations in its lifespan.

First generation (2001–2006) 

The Avalanche was launched in September 2001 as a 2002 model on the GMT800 platform. First year Avalanches featured light gray plastic body cladding, intended to provide visual distinction from the Suburban/Yukon XL. Avalanche also gave the public an advance look at the next generation of front fascia designs for the entire GM line. A full-length chrome strip splits each lamp assembly and the grille, with a gold Chevrolet "bow tie" in the center. The hood and fenders featured aggressive folds, in contrast to the soft box of the other GMT800 models.

2003 models featured a darker cladding, but GM's new president, Rick Wagoner, demanded the removal of this "unpopular" trim (as did certain elements of the public). From mid-year, Avalanche could be ordered without the cladding. The uncladded model, known as the Without Body Hardware (or better by its initialism "WBH"), and alternatively called "slicksides" by GM marketers, resembles the '03-'05 Silverado in the front.

Avalanche was nominated for the North American SUV of the Year award and was Motor Trend magazine's Truck of the Year for 2002.

There were two engine choices:

 A Vortec 5.3 L V8 producing 285 hp (216 kW), for the half-ton 1500 series:
 A Vortec 8.1 L V8 with 340 hp (253 kW) and the 4L85-E four-speed transmission, for the three-quarter ton 2500 series. The drive train is rear-wheel drive or available with selectable high/low four-wheel drive.

The Avalanche was originally marketed as being able to "change from an SUV to a super SUV". This was made possible by a plastic cover and an exclusive "midgate", called the Convert-a-Cab system by GM, which could open and close. The midgate was a divider behind the second row of seats that could be folded down, with the seats, to create a longer bed area, or folded up to make a larger cab area. A similar midgate was found on the Cadillac Escalade EXT, Hummer H2 SUT and the GMC Envoy XUV.

For those who planned to go off-road in their Avalanche, a Z71 Off-Road package was available that added off-road suspension, GM's AutoTrac full-time, push-button four-wheel-drive system, all-terrain P265/70R17 white-lettered Goodyear tires, seventeen-inch alloy wheels, leather seating surfaces with waterproof accents, front dual power bucket seats, cloth door panel inserts, GM's OnStar telematics system, all-weather rubber floor mats, Chevrolet bowtie emblems embedded into the backrests of the seats (for 2002 models), dual-zone automatic climate controls with rear HVAC vents and remote controls, remote radio controls with headphone jacks for two pairs of headphones, a security system, gray-finished side running boards, power-adjustable, heated, side view mirrors, SRS side impact airbags, and more. Aside from these details, a Z71 Off-Road decal on the rear side panels identified an Avalanche equipped with this package. Full leather seating surfaces were an available option, also removing the cloth door panel inserts, and also added heated front seats.

For those who liked the styling of the Z71 Off-Road package but did not plan to take their Avalanche off-road, a Z66 Premium On-Road package was also available. The Z66 On-Road package featured all the equipment that the Z71 Off-Road package offered but replaced the off-road suspension with sport on-road suspension and did not offer four-wheel-drive. Aside from these details, a Z66 On-Road sticker on the rear side panels identified an Avalanche equipped with this package. As with the Z71 Off-Road package, full leather seating surfaces without the cloth accents were an available option, also removing the cloth door panel inserts, and also added heated front seats.

To further distinguish it from its Silverado siblings, the Avalanche was practically fully equipped and only came with bodyside cladding. The Avalanche included features such as 16-inch alloy wheels and tires (chromed steel on the 2500 model), an AM/FM stereo with single-disc CD player and six speakers, cloth seating surfaces, front bench seat with power front driver's seat, power windows, power door locks, keyless entry, full instrumentation, dual front airbags, and air conditioning. Options included OnStar telematics system, cassette player, leather seating surfaces, front dual power bucket seats that could be heated, and side airbags for the front seats. A North Face Edition, in partnership with the North Face brand included limited exterior color options, a unique Ebony/Green leather interior, special exterior ornamentation and decals, white-faced gauges, OnStar telematics system, specially colored door panel inserts and speaker grilles, and more.

For 2003, the Avalanche was slightly changed. A new interior, shared with the Chevrolet Tahoe and Chevrolet Suburban, added a new, larger steering wheel with subsequent audio system and OnStar controls and cruise and speed controls, an optional six-speaker premium Bose sound system with external amplifier, a new gauge cluster with information center, memory for the front driver's seat, brake and accelerator pedals and side view mirror position (on some models), new radio head units, which included an AM/FM stereo with single-disc CD/MP3 player and Radio Data System or an AM/FM stereo with six-disc CD/MP3 changer and Radio Data System, optional XM Satellite Radio, standard OnStar telematics system, optional rear audio controls with headphone jacks, an optional rear DVD entertainment system by Panasonic with wireless headphones, new warning chimes that played through the vehicle's audio system instead of through a separate speaker behind the dashboard, and newly available 17-inch alloy wheels and tires.

Cladding trouble
Soon after the release of the Chevrolet Avalanche, customers began to notice cosmetic problems with the cladding on their vehicles. Over time exposure to heat and sunlight would cause a chalky faded appearance. It was especially noticeable on the cargo bed panels, and sail-panel windows where "Zebra Striping" would appear. Customer reaction to this problem resulted in General Motors agreeing to a one-time treatment of a product called ArmorDillo. This product would temporarily restore the cladding for a period of about 6 months. After that it would wear off then need to be re-applied. Realizing this was not a permanent solution, GM, together with Gatorback Coatings, developed a coating that could be applied to the cladding to restore it to a like-new shine. This product was designed to etch into the plastic and bond a new layer of tinted acrylic over the faded plastic. Customers within the 3yr/36,000 original factory warranty could go to their dealership to have it restored under their original warranty under GM TSB:04-08-111-001C. General Motors did not use side body cladding on the second generation model. General Motors has also identified the original source of the faded cladding.

Second generation (2007–2013) 

The GMT900 Avalanche was introduced at the Chicago Auto Show in February 2006. Production of the redesigned Avalanche began at the Silao Assembly in April 2006. The Avalanche maintained the styled front end much like its sister vehicles, the Tahoe/Yukon and Suburban/Yukon XL, yet it still had the distinct midgate and integrated bed as found on the previous incarnation. It had all the same standard and available features as the Suburban and the Tahoe. The 2500 model of the previous generation was discontinued.

A special Z71 package was offered for the second-generation Avalanche, available on the LT trim with either the 2LT or 3LT option groups. This off-road package consisted of a suspension tuned for rough terrain, an exclusive automatic locking rear differential, aluminum under body skid plates (visible from the front of the pickup truck), wheel flares, badges, wheels and tires.

Later models introduced another version of the Vortec 5.3-liter V8 as the engine is now capable of running on E85 ethanol.

A 2007 Avalanche was given away to the Most Valuable Player of the 2006 Major League Baseball All-Star Game, Michael Young.

For the 2009 model year, a Bluetooth hands-free phone system was added to all Avalanche models, and was integrated with the vehicle's OnStar telematics system, and the 4L60-E four-speed automatic transmission was replaced with a more modern 6L80-E unit for both engines.

Following the 2009 model year, the 6.0L V8 engine option was dropped from the Avalanche lineup (in addition to being discontinued from the related Chevrolet Suburban 1500 and Chevrolet Tahoe), leaving the standard 5.3L V8 as the Avalanche's sole engine option.

Trim levels

The second-generation Avalanche came in three well-equipped trim levels:

The LS served as the base model Avalanche. It included 17-inch alloy wheels and tires, cloth seating surfaces, power front driver's bucket seat, OnStar telematics system, an AM/FM stereo with single-disc CD/MP3 player and auxiliary audio input jack with six speakers, keyless entry, and black door handles, tailgate handle, and side mirrors, aluminum interior trim, front and side airbags, traction control, StabiliTrak, and more. A Bluetooth hands-free phone system was added starting with the 2009 model year.

The LT served as the mid-level model Avalanche. It added power dual front bucket seats, remote start, XM Satellite Radio, Bluetooth hands-free telephone system, and exterior color-keyed door handles, tailgate handle, and side mirrors, wood interior trim, as well as other features. Later models also included leather seating surfaces with heated front seats and a Bose premium audio system with an amplifier and subwoofer. A Bluetooth hands-free phone system was added starting with the 2009 model year.

The LTZ was the top-of-the-line model Avalanche. It added leather seating surfaces, security alarm, an AM/FM stereo with six-disc CD/MP3/DVD changer, an eight-speaker premium Bose CenterPoint amplified surround sound system, memory for the front driver's seat, 20-inch polished alloy wheels and tires, and rear seat audio and video system controls, and the LTZ exclusive self-leveling Auto Ride suspension. Later models also included a touchscreen GPS navigation system with SiriusXM Travel Link Services and a rear backup camera system. A Bluetooth hands-free phone system was added starting with the 2009 model year.

Black Diamond Edition

For the 2013 model year, all three trim levels of the Avalanche were sold as special-edition Black Diamond Edition models to commemorate the final year of production. While options and packages were virtually unchanged from the 2012 model year, all 2013 Avalanches received special 'Black Diamond Edition' badging on the rear pillars and rear tailgate, and buyers also received a personalized coffee table book shipped to them after purchase that included a copy of their Avalanche's window sticker, as well as a letter from Chevrolet congratulating them on their purchase. The book included information about the development of the original 2002 Chevrolet Avalanche, as well as "behind-the-scenes" photos from Silao Assembly showing the Avalanche being assembled, and Avalanche owner photos of their trucks.

Engines:
 5.3-liter Vortec 5300 V8 with Active Fuel Management, 
 6.0-liter VortecMAX V8 with VVT and Active Fuel Management,  (late 2006 to 2009 models only)

Discontinuation
Production of the Avalanche ended after the 2013 model year, after 2011 saw a sales decline of 2.6% to 20,088 vehicles. Production of the Cadillac Escalade EXT also ended after the 2013 model year.

Awards
2002 - Motor Trend Truck of the Year
2007 - Best New Pickup by Automotive Journalists Association of Canada
2010 - J.D. Power Highest initial quality large light-duty pickup
2013 - J.D. Power Highest initial quality large light-duty pickup
2020 - Consumer Reports No. 6 on CR's 10 Most Reliable Used Pickups (2012-2013 model years)

Sales

References

External links
Chevrolet Avalanche official site

All-wheel-drive vehicles
Avalanche
Flexible-fuel vehicles
Sport utility trucks
Rear-wheel-drive vehicles
2010s cars
Cars introduced in 2001
Cars discontinued in 2013